Elk Mountain Brewing Company is a microbrewery based in Parker, Colorado.

History
Elk Mountain Brewing, Inc. opened on July 1, 2010 in Parker, Colorado.  Co-owner Tom Bell began homebrewing over 20 years ago with the dream of opening a brewery of his own one day.  After an internship brewing for Tabernash Brewing Company in Longmont, Colorado, Tom began the process of opening his own brewery in his hometown of Parker, CO.  After many months of construction, he opened his doors in July 2010.  Elk Mountain won a Silver medal at the Colorado State Fair Craft Brewing Competition with their Ghost Town Brown.

Jake Minturn and Doug Hyndman purchased the brewery in 2017. They intent to rebrand once the federal Tax and Trade Bureau have approved the change.

List of Beers Brewed

Awards
Elk Mountain, although new to the craft beer scene in Colorado, managed to win a Silver medal for their Ghost Town Brown in the first few months of being open.

References

Beer brewing companies based in Colorado
American companies established in 2010
2010 establishments in Colorado
Parker, Colorado